This is a list of Panjabi films of the 1930s.

1930s

External links 
 Punjabi films at the Internet Movie Database

1930s
Lists of 1930s films
Films